Kasu Brahmananda Reddy (28 July 1909 – 20 May 1994) was the Chief Minister of United Andhra Pradesh, India, from 29 February 1964 to 30 September 1971. On 3 June 1977, he was elected president of the Indian National Congress.

Early life
Kasu Brahmananda Reddy was born in Tubadu in Guntur District, British India(now in Andhra Pradesh, India). His early education took place in Guntur and he graduated from Madras Presidency College. He also studied in Kerala. He practised law and was a very successful advocate.

Career
Reddy is credited with creating the Industrial infrastructure in and around Hyderabad. He was Second Congress Leader to expel Indira Gandhi from Indian National Congress. During his long regime of seven years (longest for any Congress chief minister in the state of Andhra Pradesh), many major industries like BHEL, HMT, IDPL, Hindustan Cables and several defence establishments like MIDHANI, Bharath Dynamics were established. During his tenure as the Chief Minister, Jalagam Vengal Rao, the Home Minister was instrumental in suppressing the Naxal movement in the north coastal Andhra Pradesh.

Reddy also held key positions such as Telecommunications Minister, Home Minister of India (1974–1977) and Governor of Maharashtra (20 February 1988 to 18 January 1990). He was also only one of two elected All India Congress Committee Presidents, all others having been nominated.

Reddy spared no effort to keep AP united, even in the face of the 1969 Telangana Agitation. It is said that over 9 months of the movement, about 370 youngsters and students were killed in police firings and that more than 70,000 people were arrested of which 7,000 were women and that people were lathi-charged 3,266 times, and about 20,000 people were injured in the lathi charge, and 1,840 people had received bullet injuries and fractures, tear gas was supposedly used 1,870 times. It is alleged that all of this was suppressed by the then Kasu Brahmananda Reddy government by using brute force.

The famous Chiran Palace was named after Kasu Brahmananda Reddy National Park in Jubilee Hills, Hyderabad, in his honor.

References

External links

History of Andhra

1909 births
1994 deaths
Telugu politicians
Chief Ministers of Andhra Pradesh
Governors of Maharashtra
Ministers of Internal Affairs of India
University of Madras alumni
Chief ministers from Indian National Congress
Indian National Congress politicians from Andhra Pradesh
People from Guntur district
India MPs 1977–1979
India MPs 1980–1984
Lok Sabha members from Andhra Pradesh
Indian National Congress (U) politicians
Commerce and Industry Ministers of India